The 1999 Volta a la Comunitat Valenciana was the 57th edition of the Volta a la Comunitat Valenciana road cycling stage race, which was held from 23 February to 27 February 1999. The race started in Villarreal and finished in Benidorm. The race was won by Alexander Vinokourov of the  team.

General classification

References

Volta a la Comunitat Valenciana
Volta a la Comunitat Valenciana
Volta a la Comunitat Valenciana